Ravivaar With Star Parivaar ( "Sunday with Star Family") is an Indian Hindi-language television game show that premiered on 12 June 2022 on StarPlus. It digitally streams on Disney+ Hotstar. The series is a remake of the Tamil reality script show Enkitta Modhaade The series is hosted by Arjun Bijlani and Amaal Mallik and features various StarPlus television series casts competing in a music competition. The show features eight Star Plus's shows competing against each other to win the title of Best Parivaar. Team Yeh Rishta Kya Kehlata Hai emerged as the winner of the show.

Cast
Team Anupamaa:
 Rupali Ganguly (Episode 1,2,4,5,7,8,9,10,11,12,14,15,16)
 Gaurav Khanna (Episode 1,2,4,5,7,8,9,10,11,12,14,15,16)
 Sudhanshu Pandey (Episode 1,2,4,5,7,8,9,15,16)
 Madalsa Sharma Chakraborty (Episode 1,2,5,7,8,9)
 Aashish Mehrotra (Episode 2,11,15,16)
 Alpana Buch (Episode 2,4,5,9,16)
 Shekhar Shukla (Episode 2,5,9,13,16)
 Tasneem Sheikh (Episode 2,5,9,12,13,16)
 Nidhi Shah (Episode 11,15,16)
 Muskaan Bamne (Episode 5,16)

Team Imlie:
 Sumbul Touqeer Khan (Episode 1,3,4,5,6,7,8,9,12,13,14,15,16)
 Fahmaan Khan (Episode 1,3,5,7,8,9,12,13,14,15,16)
 Gaurav Mukesh (Episode 1,3,4,5,7,13,16)
 Nilima Singh (Episode 1,3,4,5,7,9,12,13,16)
 Rajshri Rani (Episode 3,5,16)
 Neetu Pandey (Episode 3,16) 
 Resham Prashant (Episode 3,4,5,16)
 Vaibhavi Kapoor (Episode 3,5)

Team Yeh Rishta Kya Kehlata Hai:
 Pranali Rathod (Episode 1,3,4,6,7,8,10,11,14,15,16)
 Harshad Chopda (Episode 1,3,4,7,8,14,16)
 Karishma Sawant (Episode 1,3,16)
 Sachin Tyagi (Episode 1,3,7,15,16)
 Mayank Arora (Episode 3,16)
 Sharan Anandani (Episode 3,16)
 Vinay Jain (Episode 3,4,16)
 Pragati Mehra (Episode 3,4,16)
 Ami Trivedi (Episode 7,8,11,16)
 Paras Priyadarshan (Episode 11,16)

Team Pandya Store:
 Shiny Doshi (Episode 1,6,7,13,14,16)
 Kinshuk Mahajan (Episode 1,6,13,14,16)
 Alice Kaushik (Episode 1,6,8,9,11,12,13,14,15,16)
 Kanwar Dhillon (Episode 1,6,7,8,9,10,11,12,13,14,15,16)
 Akshay Kharodia (Episode 6,16)
 Simran Budharup (Episode 6,7,10,16)
 Krutika Desai Khan (Episode 6,7,9,11,16)
 Mohit Parmar (Episode 6,16)

Team Ghum Hai Kisikey Pyaar Meiin:
 Ayesha Singh (Episode 1,2,7,8,10,11,16)
 Neil Bhatt (Episode 1,2,7,8,9,12,15,16)
 Aishwarya Sharma Bhatt(Episode 1,2,7,12,16)
 Kishori Shahane (Episode 1,2,7,12,13,16)
 Sheetal Maulik (Episode 2)
 Mridul Kumar Sinha (Episode 2)
 Tanvi Thakkar (Episode 2)
 Sachin Shroff (Episode 2)

Team Banni Chow Home Delivery:
 Ulka Gupta (Episode 1,6,7,9,10,12,13,14,15,16)
 Pravisht Mishra (Episode 1,6,7,9,12,13,14,15,16)
 Rajendra Chawla (Episode 1,6,7,9,16)
 Parvati Sehgal (Episode 1,6,7,9,16)

Team Saath Nibhaana Saathiya 2:
 Sneha Jain (Episode 1,7)
 Gautam Vig (Episode 1,7)
 Akanksha Juneja (Episode 1)
 Roma Bali (Episode 1,7)
 Hargun Grover (Episode 7)

Team Yeh Hai Chahatein:
(Eliminated Week 7)
 Sargun Kaur Luthra (Episode 1,4,7)
 Abrar Qazi (Episode 1,4,7)
 Mallika Nayak (Episode 1,4,7)
 Swarna Pandey (Episode 1)
 Siddharth Shivpuri (Episode 1,7)

Team Saas (Week 4):
 Alpana Buch - Anupamaa
 Mallika Nayak -Yeh Hai Chahatein
 Nilima Singh - Imlie
 Pragati Mehra - Yeh Rishta Kya Kehlata Hai

Team Bahu (Week 4):
 Rupali Ganguly - Anupamaa
 Sargun Kaur Luthra - Yeh Hai Chahatein
 Sumbul Touqeer Khan - Imlie
 Pranali Rathod - Yeh Rishta Kya Kehlata Hai

Team Pati (Week 8):
 Gaurav Khanna - Anupamaa
 Kanwar Dhillon - Pandya Store
 Fahmaan Khan - Imlie
 Harshad Chopda - Yeh Rishta Kya Kehlata Hai
 Neil Bhatt - Ghum Hai Kisikey Pyaar Meiin
 Sudhanshu Pandey - Anupamaa
 Vinay Jain - Yeh Rishta Kya Kehlata Hai

Team Patni (Week 8):
 Rupali Ganguly - Anupamaa
 Alice Kaushik - Pandya Store
 Sumbul Touqeer Khan - Imlie
 Pranali Rathod - Yeh Rishta Kya Kehlata Hai
 Ayesha Singh - Ghum Hai Kisikey Pyaar Meiin
 Madalsa Sharma Chakraborty - Anupamaa
 Ami Trivedi - Yeh Rishta Kya Kehlata Hai

Team Ladki Wale (Week 9)
 Kanwar Dhillon - Pandya Store
 Alice Kaushik - Pandya Store
 Fahmaan Khan - Imlie
 Sumbul Touqeer Khan - Imlie
 Pranali Rathod - Yeh Rishta Kya Kehlata Hai
 Krutika Desai Khan - Pandya Store
 Tasneem Sheikh - Anupamaa
 Nilima Singh - Ghum Hai Kisikey Pyaar Meiin

Team Ladke Wale (Week 9)
 Rupali Ganguly - Anupamaa
 Gaurav Khanna - Anupamaa
 Sudhanshu Pandey - Anupamaa
 Madalsa Sharma Chakraborty - Anupamaa
 Rajendra Chawla - Banni Chow Home Delivery
 Parvati Sehgal - Banni Chow Home Delivery
 Alpana Buch - Anupamaa
 Neil Bhatt - Ghum Hai Kisikey Pyaar Meiin

Team Rab Ne Bana Di Jodi [RNBDJ] (Week 14)
 Alice Kaushik - Pandya Store
 Kanwar Dhillon - Pandya Store
 Pranali Rathod - Yeh Rishta Kya Kehlata Hai
 Harshad Chopda - Yeh Rishta Kya Kehlata Hai
 Rupali Ganguly - Anupamaa
 Gaurav Khanna - Anupamaa

Team Ek Duje Ke Liye [EDKL] (Week 14)
 Sumbul Touqeer Khan - Imlie
 Fahmaan Khan - Imlie
 Shiny Doshi - Pandya Store
 Kinshuk Mahajan - Pandya Store
 Ulka Gupta - Banni Chow Home Delivery
 Pravisht Mishra - Banni Chow Home Delivery

Team status

Winning status

Guests

References

External links
Ravivaar With Star Parivaar at Disney+ Hotstar

Indian game shows
2022 Indian television series debuts
StarPlus original programming
2022 Indian television seasons
Hindi-language television shows